The Mayor of Yangon is the head of Yangon's government. The mayor concurrently serves as the chairman of the Yangon City Development Committee.

History

The office of the mayor and the municipal government of Rangoon were established by the British colonial government in 1874 per the Act of 1874, Article 7. The charter of the municipal government was changed per the Burma Act of 1898, and again updated per the City of Rangoon Municipal Act of August 1922.

List

The following is a list of mayors of Yangon, Myanmar.

References